Sogdianus ( or) was briefly a ruler of the Achaemenid Empire for a period in 424–423 BC. His short rule—lasting not much more than six months—and the little recognition of his kingdom are known primarily from the writings of Ctesias; who is known to be unreliable. He was reportedly an illegitimate son of Artaxerxes I by his concubine Alogyne of Babylon.

Background

Death of Artaxerxes I 
The last inscription mentioning Artaxerxes I being alive can be dated to December 24, 424 BC. His death resulted in at least three of his sons proclaiming themselves King of Kings. The first was Xerxes II, who was reportedly his only legitimate son by Queen Damaspia and was formerly the heir. Xerxes II's rule was apparently only recognized in the Persian heartlands. The second was Sogdianus himself, presumed to have initially been recognized only in Elam. The third was Ochus, son of Artaxerxes I by his concubine Cosmartidene of Babylon and satrap of Hyrcania. Ochus was also married to their common half-sister Parysatis, daughter of Artaxerxes I and his concubine Andia of Babylon. The first inscription of Ochus as Darius II can be dated to January 10, 423 BC. He seems to have been recognized by Medes, Babylonia and Egypt. If it is correct that all three declared themselves king at the same time, then  the Achaemenid Empire had three King of Kings for a brief period.

Rise and fall 

This chaotic state of affairs would prove short-lived. Xerxes II only ruled for forty-five days. He was reportedly murdered while drunk by Pharnacyas and Menostanes, conspirators who sided with Sogdianus, on his orders. Sogdianus apparently gained the support of his regions and reigned for six months and fifteen days before being captured by his half-brother, Ochus, who had rebelled against him feeling dishonoured he was passed up over Sogdianus for the throne—since he outranked the latter. Sogdianus was executed by being suffocated in ash per Ochus' promise he would not die by the sword, by poison or by hunger. Ochus then ascended to the Achaemenid throne as Darius II; he was the sole ruler of the Persian Empire until 404 BC.

Name

References

 

423 BC deaths
5th-century BC Kings of the Achaemenid Empire
5th-century BC Pharaohs
5th-century BC Babylonian kings
Pharaohs of the Achaemenid dynasty of Egypt
Twenty-seventh Dynasty of Egypt
5th-century BC murdered monarchs
Murdered Persian monarchs
5th-century BC Iranian people
Deaths from asphyxiation
Executed monarchs
Year of birth unknown